Shepherd's Hill Academy (SHA) is an accredited and licensed Christian therapeutic boarding school located in Martin, Georgia, United States, that provides year-round residential care and a private school for grades 7 through 12.

History 

Shepherd's Hill Academy was founded in 1994 by Trace Embry and his wife Beth. Embry attended Toccoa Falls College (TFC) and work for the Georgia Department of Juvenile Justice. During his time at TFC, Embry and his family searched Northeast Georgia for property that would eventually become Shepherd's Hill Academy. Embry purchased a 60-acre tract of land in Martin for $200.

From 2001 to 2003, Shepherd's Hill Academy partnered with the Atlanta-based school Gables Academy in a joint effort to provide residential care to families. At that time, the program was known as "The Edge at Shepherd's Hill."

Now on 185 acres, Shepherd's Hill Academy is an accredited private school and licensed residential care for students and their families.

Governance 

Shepherd's Hill Academy is a 501(c)(3) organization governed by a board of directors with responsibilities for assigning an Executive Director, for operational policies and for the annual financial budget. Day-to-day operations are led by the Executive Director. Shepherd's Hill Academy's academic program and faculty are overseen by a Georgia-certified on-site principal. The therapeutic program and residential care are overseen by a licensed therapist.

Private school 

Shepherd's Hill Academy's private school is accredited for grades 7-12 through the Georgia Accrediting Commission (GAC) under Education Agency with Special Purposes accreditation.  SHA is a member of the Georgia Association of Christian Schools, and the National Association of Therapeutic Schools and Programs, and its courses are sanctioned by the  National Collegiate Athletic Association Eligibility Center.

SHA provides Advanced Placement (AP) classes through Georgia Virtual School and extra-curricular opportunities including intramural sports and field trips.

Although it previously served 50 students, it has since been licensed to serve 36.

Residential care 

Shepherd's Hill Academy offers a residential care facility licensed by the Georgia Department of Human Services through its Outdoor Child Caring Program. SHA is a member of the American Association of Christian Counselors and the National Association of Therapeutic Schools and Programs.

The structure of SHA's therapeutic program follows the "authoritative community model" discussed in Hardwired to Connect: The New Scientific Case for Authoritative Communities, a study conducted by the YMCA of the USA, Geisel School of Medicine and the Institute for American Values.

According to Embry in a 2016 podcast, annual tuition for residential care was US$88,900.

Controversies 
Aaden Friday of Medium, reporting on alleged SHA mistreatment of teens, wrote, "SHA is now fully licensed by the state of Georgia, but it has surfaced several ethical concerns, including the lack of appropriate care for teens with mental health issues, abusive treatment, and anti-LGBTQ practices similar to those practiced at conversion camps." Additionally, Friday wrote that Embry "openly advocated for religion as a substitute for professional mental health treatment", and believes most mental illnesses are caused by anhedonia. Friday quotes Dr. Jean Kim, a clinical assistant professor of psychiatry at George Washington University, "...if [Embry] had a licensed professional screen clients and triage them for appropriateness into his program, that would be less worrisome." 

In the second article in that series Friday described the school as "a Georgia-based Christian boarding school with a history of alleged abuse, conversion therapy for LGBTQ teens, and religious indoctrination." He wrote, "Trace Embry, who has no medical training or college degree, believes that students who have been diagnosed by professionals with very real and treatable mental illnesses are actually suffering from too much technology use, the overconsumption of media, and a lack of religious conviction."

Media 

 Executive Director Trace Embry hosts the radio broadcast License to Parent from a studio at SHA, and is a member of the National Religious Broadcasters. 
 Embry contributed to the book The Digital Invasion.  
 SHA staff and students were featured in a documentary directed by Colin Gunn and produced by Phillip Telfer, Captivated - The Movie, which outlines the effects of media on human behavior and brain chemistry.

See also 

 Franklin County Schools

References

External links 
 
 

Therapeutic boarding schools in the United States
Boarding schools in Georgia (U.S. state)